The Conservative Friends of India is linked to the Conservative Party in the UK, and is a membership organization which engages with the British Indian community and played a significant role in the Conservative campaign in the 2019 general election, as well as supporting the development of stronger India–United Kingdom relations. It actively campaigns for the Conservative Party in the British Indian community. The organisation was also responsible for releasing Hindi campaign songs for the Conservative Party in recent elections supporting David Cameron, Theresa May and Zac Goldsmith.

The organisation's events have been attended by the High Commissioner of India to the United Kingdom.

Board

Co-chairmen
 Zac Goldsmith MP
 Rami Ranger, Baron Ranger
Director Nayaz Qazi

Vice chairs
 Bob Blackman MP
 Paul Scully MP
 Theresa Villiers MP

Patrons
 Theresa May MP
 Iain Duncan Smith MP
 Nus Ghani MP
 Alok Sharma MP
 Tom Tugendhat MP
 Shailesh Vara MP

References

External links
 Official website

Organisations associated with the Conservative Party (UK)
United Kingdom friendship associations
India–United Kingdom relations
Indian diaspora in the United Kingdom
Diaspora organisations based in London
India friendship associations